The Philadelphia Phillies are a Major League Baseball team based in Philadelphia, Pennsylvania. They  are a member of the Eastern Division of Major League Baseball's National League. The team has played officially under two names since beginning play in 1883: the current moniker, as well as the "Quakers", which was used in conjunction with "Phillies" during the team's early history. The team was also known unofficially as the "Blue Jays" during the World War II era. Since the franchise's inception,  players have made an appearance in a competitive game for the team, whether as an offensive player (batting and baserunning) or a defensive player (fielding, pitching, or both).

Of those  Phillies, 101 have had surnames beginning with the letter L. One of those players, second baseman Nap Lajoie, has been inducted into the Baseball Hall of Fame; he played for Philadelphia for five seasons (1896–1900). Greg Luzinski is a member of the Philadelphia Baseball Wall of Fame; the left fielder played for the Phillies for 11 seasons, batting .281 and hitting 253 doubles.

Among the 56 batters in this list, catcher Mike Loan has the highest batting average, at .500; he hit safely in one of his two career at-bats with the Phillies. Other players with an average above .300 include Lajoie (.345), Ralph LaPointe (.308 in one season), Freddy Leach (.312 in six seasons), Dan Leahy (.333 in one season), Cliff W. Lee (.315 in four seasons), Greg Legg (.409 in two seasons), Jesse Levan (.444 in one season), Jim Lindeman (.313 in two seasons), and Kenny Lofton (.335 in one season). Luzinski leads all members of this list with 223 home runs and 811 runs batted in.

Of this list's 46 pitchers, the best win–loss record, in terms of winning percentage, is shared by three pitchers: Bobby Locke, who won one game in three seasons (1962–1964) with the Phillies; Kyle Lohse, who went 3–0 in 2007; and Marcelino López, who posted a 1–0 record during the 1963 season. Jim Lonborg's 75 victories and 60 defeats are tops in both of those statistical categories, and he also leads in strikeouts, with 551 in 7 seasons. In earned run average, Aquilino López is the leader; he averaged 2.13 earned runs per game in 2005.

Johnny Lush is one of the ten Phillies pitchers who have thrown a no-hitter, accomplishing the feat on May 1, 1906. Lush also made more than 30% of his career appearances with Philadelphia as a first baseman, batting .254 and amassing 53 extra-base hits.

Footnotes
Key
 The National Baseball Hall of Fame and Museum determines which cap a player wears on their plaque, signifying "the team with which he made his most indelible mark". The Hall of Fame considers the player's wishes in making their decision, but the Hall makes the final decision as "it is important that the logo be emblematic of the historical accomplishments of that player's career".
 Players are listed at a position if they appeared in 30% of their games or more during their Phillies career, as defined by Baseball-Reference. Additional positions may be shown on the Baseball-Reference website by following each player's citation.
 Franchise batting and pitching leaders are drawn from Baseball-Reference. A total of 1,500 plate appearances are needed to qualify for batting records, and 500 innings pitched or 50 decisions are required to qualify for pitching records.
 Statistics are correct as of the end of the 2010 Major League Baseball season.

List
Pete Laforest is listed by Baseball-Reference as a catcher, but never appeared in a game in the field for the Phillies.
Ed Levy is listed by Baseball-Reference as a left fielder and first baseman, but never appeared in a game in the field for the Phillies.
Terry Lyons entered one game as a defensive replacement and did not bat.

References
General

Inline citations

L